Aragon was an  unprotected cruiser of the Spanish Navy in the late 19th century.

Technical characteristics
Aragon was built at the naval shipyard at Cartagena, Spain. Political events delayed her construction. In 1870, her design was changed to that of an unprotected cruiser or wooden corvette, and she finally was launched in this form on 31 July 1879 and completed in 1880 Her original conception as an armored ship and the change to an unarmored one during construction left her with an overly heavy wooden hull that was obsolescent by the time of her launch.

Designed for colonial service, she had two funnels and was rigged as a barque. Her machinery was manufactured by the John Penn Company of Greenwich, United Kingdom. The original main battery of Armstrong-built  guns was obsolescent when she was completed, and were quickly replaced with more modern Hontoria-built  guns (a heavier main battery than that carried by her two sisters  and ), at least four of which were mounted in sponsons.

Operational history

In the 1890s, Aragon was assigned to the Cadiz Naval Group. She went out of service in the mid-1890s and became a floating hulk in 1896. Sources differ on her ultimate fate; either she was sold for scrap in 1900 or stricken c. 1905

Notes

References
Chesneau, Roger, and Eugene M. Kolesnik, Eds. Conway's All The World's Fighting Ships 1860–1905. New York, New York: Mayflower Books Inc., 1979. .
Nofi, Albert A. The Spanish–American War, 1898. Conshohocken, Pennsylvania:Combined Books, Inc., 1996. .

External links
The Spanish–American War Centennial Website: Spanish Wooden Cruisers
Department of the Navy: Naval Historical Center: Online Library of Selected Images: Spanish Navy Ships: Aragon (Cruiser, 1879–1900)

Aragon-class cruisers
Ships built in Spain
1879 ships
Spanish–American War cruisers of Spain